Elements of Life is the third studio album by Dutch DJ Tiësto. It was released on 6 April 2007 (see 2007 in music). The album contains collaborations with Jes of Motorcycle, Julie Thompson of Holden & Thompson, Charlotte Martin, Christian Burns, BT and Maxi Jazz of Faithless. BT collaborates with Tiësto for the first time since "Love Comes Again" and Faithless's rapper Maxi Jazz is featuring on "Dance4Life". The album has more tracks featuring vocals than previous albums (excluding the remixed Just Be).

The album was nominated in the category "Best Electronic/Dance Album" at the 50th Grammy Awards. In April 2007 the album moved 72,000 units according to Nielsen SoundScan. The album also received gold certifications in Belgium, Hungary, Netherlands and Romania.

Production
During the production of the album Tiësto in several cases sent a demo with the music to certain artists, and they replied back with the lyrics and vocals and other duration times. In the case of Christian Burns from BB Mak, Tiësto met him through MySpace and got in contact with him and the production of the single "In the Dark".
The album consists of rock, trance and experimental music, which shows the style Tiësto has grown throughout the years since his previous albums which contained lyrics, In My Memory and Just Be. Producer Brian Transeau collaborated with Tiësto in three tracks, he composed "Bright Morningstar" and "Sweet Things", he also performed the vocals in the single "Break My Fall". Together, they produce more tracks which were not released in the album, and Tiësto has mentioned they would work again during the coming summer.

Marketing
In support of the album, he embarked on his Elements of Life World Tour, the Elements of Life World Tour DVD was released in a party which was held on 29 February 2008 from 8 p.m. - 3 a.m. in London at the IndigO2 club. With the successful release of Elements of Life, Tiësto and fashion designer Giorgio Armani collaborated on a limited edition Tiësto T-shirt available at Armani Exchange stores. His single "Sweet Things" comes with the shirt including an exclusive "A|X Remix" by Tom Cloud which shows the great influence Tiësto has in fashion culture. Tiësto and Reebok introduced the new 'Tiësto shoe' in November 2007. The shoebox comes with a special limited-edition Tiësto & Reebok CD, containing the Elements of Life album and the bonus disc. Only 1,000 pair units were available for sale in Netherlands. On 28 April, Tiësto released Elements of Life: Remixed, a recompilation of the Elements of Life album with all songs except "He's a Pirate" being replaced by remixed versions, and "He's a Pirate" being replaced by "No More Heroes", a joint production with mute performer trio Blue Man Group. It was announced in October 2014 that the album would be reissued as a High Fidelity Pure Audio Blu-ray Disc in December 2014, featuring a brand new 9.1 Auro-3D mix as well as a 5.1 DTS-HD Master Audio track. Both surround mixes are presented at 24-bit/96 kHz resolution.

Track listing

Notes
 signifies a vocal producer
 signifies an additional producer
 signifies a remixer
In some territories (including the United States), track 12 is "He's a Pirate" (7:00), a remix of the theme music of Pirates of the Caribbean: The Curse of the Black Pearl also featured on the CD single, and on initial retail shipments of Best Buy's exclusive version of the movie soundtrack. "Everything (Acoustic Version)" is excluded. 
The Limited Edition version contains the original album with the remix of "He's a Pirate" and a bonus disc.

Charts and certifications

Weekly charts

Year-end charts

Certifications

Release history

See also
 Elements of Life World Tour
 Elements of Life World Tour DVD
 Elements of Life: Remixed

References

7. 72,000 albums sold in the U.S. http://www.tiesto.com/

External links
 Tiesto.com

2007 albums
Tiësto albums